Anthony Vaz (14 September 1932 – 7 August 1982) was a Kenyan field hockey player. He competed at the 1956 Summer Olympics, the 1960 Summer Olympics and the 1964 Summer Olympics.

References

External links
 

1932 births
1982 deaths
Kenyan male field hockey players
Olympic field hockey players of Kenya
Field hockey players at the 1956 Summer Olympics
Field hockey players at the 1960 Summer Olympics
Field hockey players at the 1964 Summer Olympics
Place of birth missing
Kenyan people of Indian descent
Kenyan people of Goan descent
Kenyan emigrants to the United Kingdom
British sportspeople of Indian descent
British people of Goan descent